Sou Ni Tilé is an album by Malian duo Amadou & Mariam, released in 1999. It was their first album to be released internationally. The album reached No. 61 on the French albums chart. "Je Pense à Toi" reached No. 43 on the French singles chart.

In a review for Allmusic, Brian Beatty gave the album a rating of four stars out of five and described it as "mature, intelligent pop music".

Track listing
"Je Pense à Toi" (I Think of You) — 5:16
"Combattants" (Warriors) — 4:26
"Mouna" (I Wonder Why?) — 4:44
"Pauvre Type" (Poor Guy) — 4:35
"Dogons" — 4:04
"Baara" (Work) — 4:33
"Dounia" (The World) — 3:17
"A Radio Mogo" — 4:49
"Djandjola" (Adventure) — 4:06
"On Se Donne La Main" (Hand in Hand) — 4:34
"Mon Amour, Ma Chérie" (My Love, My Darling) — 5:23
"A Chacun Son Problème" — 4:40
"Teree La Sebin" (Evil Eye) — 5:33
"Toubala Kono" (Lonely Bird) — 5:22
"C'est La Vie" (That's Life) — 5:26

Personnel

Music
Walde Baba Sissoko —tama
Amadou Bagayoko — composer, guitar, vocals
Shihab M'Ghezzi Bekhoughe —bass
Sameh Catalan —violin
Mariam Doumbia —vocals
Sanata Doumbia —background vocals
Barbara Teuntor Garcia —trumpet
Alain Hatot —flute, transverse flute
Idwar Iskandar —Arabian flute, flute, ney
Johar Ali Khan —violin
Loïc Landois —harmonica
Matu —Fender Rhodes, Hammond organ
Alberto Rodriguez —arranger, trombone
Stephane San Juan —drums, percussion
Babbaro Teunter Garcia —trumpet
Awa Timbo —vocals, background vocals
Andrés Viáfara —arranger, trombone

Production
Jean-Philippe Allard — executive producer
Amadou Bagayoko — producer
Laurent Jaïs —engineer, mixing
Sherif Megahed —assistant engineer, mixing assistant
Marc Antoine Moreau —producer
Daniel Richard —executive producer
Design
Marie Laure Dagnaux —photography
Thomas Delepière —photography
Frederic Fauchet —liner notes, lyric translation
Philippe Savoir —design, visuals

References

1999 albums
Amadou & Mariam albums
PolyGram albums